The Stjarnan women's handball team is the women's handball department of Ungmennafélagið Stjarnan  multi-sport club. As of the 2021–21-2018 season, they are competing in the Úrvalsdeild kvenna and the current head coach is former National team player Rakel Dögg Bragadóttir, since March 2020.

The team won the Icelandic Cup in 2016.

Trophies and achievements
Icelandic champions (7):
1991, 1995, 1998, 1999, 2007, 2008, 2009
Icelandic Handball Cup (7):
1989, 1996, 1998, 2005, 2008, 2009, 2016
Division II (3):
20051, 20061, 20071
1 B-team

Source

Team

Current squad
Squad for the 2021-22 season

Goalkeepers
 25  Tinna Húnbjörg Einarsdóttir
 98  Darija Zecevic
Wingers
LW
 8  Anna Karen Hansdóttir
 14  Stefanía Theodórsdóttir
RW
 6  Sonja Lind Sigsteinsdóttir
 15  Hanna Guðrún Stefánsdóttir
Line players
 17  Elísabet Gunnarsdóttir
 21  Elena Elísabet Birgisdóttir
 24  Þórhildur Gunnarsdóttir

Back players
LB
 7  Karen Tinna Demian
 19  Katla María Magnúsdóttir
CB
 9  Britney Emilie Florianne Cots
 11  Helena Örvarsdóttir
 20  Eva Björk Davíðsdóttir
RB
 18  Ásthildur Bertha Bjarkadóttir
 23  Lena Margrét Valdimarsdóttir

References

External links
 

Handball teams in Iceland
Women's handball clubs
women's handball